Viti or Vitina, is a town and municipality located in the District of Gjilan in Kosovo. According to the 2011 census, the town of Viti has 4,924 inhabitants, while the municipality has 46,987 inhabitants.

Geography 
The town of Viti and the southern part of the Municipality lies on the foothills of the Skopska Crna Gora Mountains.

History

Ottoman period
The municipality has several settlements historically inhabited by the Laramans, crypto-Catholics.

Kosovo War and aftermath
During the Kosovo War 16 KLA soldiers, as well as 5 Serb soldiers and policemen were killed in Viti. The entire fighting happened in 1999 and in the southern part of the municipality, near the Karadak Mountains, in villages such as Lubishtë, Gjylekare, Mogillë, Smirë, Kabash and Dëbëlldeh.

During and after the Kosovo War 76 civilians were killed, 38 Albanians and 38 Serbs.

Following the 1999 Kosovo War, it was the home of A Company, 2/505 Parachute Infantry Regiment, 82nd Airborne Division, the first KFOR troops to begin stabilization efforts in the municipality. After the initial unit left, Viti was the site of a subsequent international scandal when a Staff Sgt. Frank J. Ronghi, from A company, 3/504 Parachute Infantry Regiment raped and killed a local girl. The subsequent investigation uncovered serious training and leadership deficiencies in the 3/504 Parachute Infantry Regiment, and catalysed a tremendous change in the training of units deploying for peacekeeping operations. The Church of the Holy Mother of God, Podgorce was looted during the conflict.

During the NATO bombing of Yugoslavia, the Orthodox cemetery in Viti and the village of Dobreš were hit by missiles.

In August 2003, explosive devices planted in Klokot destroyed five Serb houses, with several injuries, including two American KFOR soldiers.

Serbian Orthodox cemeteries have been destroyed in Viti, among other towns, and in 2004 during unrest, nuns of the Binča monastery were physically attacked, by ethnic Albanians.

Insurgency in the Preševo Valley 
During the Insurgency in the Preševo Valley, the UÇPMB mostly recruited fighters from the Karadak region of Kosovo, specifically in the town of Vitia. In February 2001, many towns and villages in the region were covered with posters that instructed Albanians between the ages of 18 and 48 to join their fellow Albanians in the UÇPMB. These posters were supposedly issued by the previously disbanded KLA.

Insurgency in Macedonia 
Amidst the Insurgency in Macedonia, approximately 300 NLA fighters from the Vitia municipality, mostly recruited in Dëbëlldeh and Mjakë, participated in several battles against Macedonian security forces in Tanuševci. The NLA also used Dëbëlldeh and Mjakë as strongholds, where they would store Arms.

Contemporary

In 2013 in response to a KLA monument being removed by Serbian authorities in Preševo, a Kosovo Albanian crowd in Viti demolished a Yugoslav-era memorial for anti-fascist Partisans that were killed during the Second World War. Members of the Kosovo Police were present but did nothing to intervene. The incident was filmed and posted to YouTube.

Municipality 

 Ballancë
 Beguncë
 Binça
 Budrikë e Epërme
 Buzovik
 Çifllak
 Dëbëlldeh
 Devajë
 Drobesh
 Gërmovë
 Gjylekar
 Goden i Madh
 Gushicë
 Kabash
 Letnicë
 Lubishtë
 Mjak
 Novosellë
 Podgorc
 Pozharan
 Radivojc
 Ramjan
 Ramnishtë
 Remnik
 Sadovinë e Çerkezëve
 Sadovinë e Jerlive
 Shasharë
 Sllatinë e Epërme
 Sllatinë e Poshtme
 Smirë
 Stubëll e Epërme
 Stubëll e Poshtme
 Tërpezë
 Tërstenik
 Vërban
 Vërnakollë
 Vërnez
 Zhiti

Demographics 

According to the last official census done in 2011, the municipality of Viti has 46,987 inhabitants. Based on the population estimates from the Kosovo Agency of Statistics in 2016, the municipality has 47,370 inhabitants.

Ethnic groups
The ethnic composition of the municipality:

Maps 
Ethnic and Religious Affiliation in the Municipality according to the 2011 census results recorded in Kosovo. Tribal Affiliation of Albanians according to the book Gornja Morava i Izmornik.

Notable People 

 Rashit Mustafa, from Lubishtë, commander of the KLA.
 Njazi Azemi, from Mogillë, commander of the KLA and LAPMB.
 Jonuz Zejnullahu, from Skifteraj, Imam and commader of the KLA.
 Shemsi Beqiri, from Viti, Kickboxing World Champion.
 Muharrem Sahiti, from Budrikë, football coach.
 Visar Ymeri, from Viti, politician.
 Sinan Hasani, from Pozheran, President of Yugoslavia
 Marko Sopi, from Binač, Catholic prelate.
 Bastien Toma, footballer
 Betim Halimi, footballer
 Liridon Krasniqi, footballer
 Milaim Rama, footballer
 Urata Rama, sports shooter

See also 
Municipalities of Kosovo
Cities and towns in Kosovo
Populated places in Kosovo

Notes

References

External links 

 Municipality of Viti

 
Municipalities of Kosovo
Cities in Kosovo